Kupang LRT station (SW3) is an elevated Light Rail Transit (LRT) station on the Sengkang LRT line West Loop in Fernvale, Sengkang, Singapore, located at Fernvale Street near the junction of Fernvale Link and next to Sengkang Riverside Park. It opened on 27 June 2015, and was the last station along the Sengkang LRT line to open for revenue service, more than 12 years after the first stations opened along the east loop and more than 10 years after the first five stations opened along the west loop.

Etymology

The word kupang means mussel in Malay; kupang fishing was a source of livelihood for the villagers in the past, and thus it is a common place name with villages in Indonesia, Brunei, and Malaysia.

References

Railway stations in Singapore opened in 2015
Fernvale, Singapore
LRT stations in Sengkang
Light Rail Transit (Singapore) stations